Sir Yazjan-e Galeh Zan Mazarai (also Romanized as Sīr Yazjān-e Galeh Zan Mazāra‘ī; also known as Sarīz Jān, Serīzjān, Serīzqān, and Surzakūn) is a village in Khvajehei Rural District, Meymand District, Firuzabad County, Fars Province, Iran. At the 2006 census, its population was 72, in 13 families.

References 

Populated places in Firuzabad County